Charlie Rosen may refer to:
 Charlie Rosen (engineer) (born 1937), an American metallurgical engineer
 Charlie Rosen (musician) (born 1990), an American jazz and classical musician

See also
 Charley Rosen (born 1941), an American basketball coach and author